Azteca Estudios is a Mexican production company owned by TV Azteca, founded in 1996 by producers Elisa Salinas and Juan David Burns in which it focuses on the direction and production of fiction, specifically telenovelas and television series.

History 
In 1993, after the privatization of Imevisión and its sale to businessman Ricardo Salinas Pliego, the acquisition of Estudios América would include Compañía Operadora de Teatros S.A de C.V and company of movie theaters. In 1995, the newly founded TV Azteca would launch its first telenovela , as a result of a partnership started by Ricardo Salinas Pliego,  and Juan David Burns.

As co-producing partners with Azteca Digital in its beginnings, they were Argos Comunicación until 2001, and ZUBA Producciones of the actors Christian Bach and Humberto Zurita until 2002. In 2000, Elisa created the popular and successful anthology series Lo que callamos las mujeres, with 2777 episodes aired until 2017 lasting 17 years on the air.

In 2003, Elisa leaves the general management of Azteca Digital, upon being promoted as general director of the KAZA-TV Canal 54 station of Azteca América, Martín Luna enters as her successor and renaming the subsidiary as TV Azteca Novelas. During Luna's management, productions were carried out with success in audience, Los Sánchez and Amor en custodia are some of them, the making of television movies and the production of the first telenovela in high definition Amores cruzados in conjunction with the Colombian television company Caracol Televisión.

In 2008 Martín Luna would leave Azteca Novelas and as a replacement, the executive Mario San Román took over as the general director of both Azteca Novelas and Azteca Trece until 2012, when Elisa Salinas would once again take over the general direction of telenovelas.

During the restructuring of TV Azteca in 2015 after the rise of Benjamín Salinas Sada as CEO of the company, in 2016 the former executive vice president of production of Telemundo Global Studios, Joshua Mintz would be integrated to take the position that Elisa had as general director of Azteca Novelas, being deputy president and fiction director of TV Azteca, to reinforce the strategic design and contribute to the long-term vision of the company, as well as being part of its reinvention process. Also the former general producer of Argos,  would join Mintz taking charge of talent coordination.

In May 2018, the departure okkf Joshua Mintz and Ana Celia Urquidi from TV Azteca would be officially announced, after the television station's commitment to reality show formats and the transformation of Azteca Uno into a 100% live one completely closing the section of telenovelas and series.

On February 16, 2021, Grupo Salinas and the Executive Vice President of TV Azteca Internacional Patricia Jasin, announce the launch of Azteca Estudios with the infrastructure of the extinct TV Azteca Novelas, mainly serving the high demand for production in the Mexico City, not only for TV Azteca as the main client for internal production, but also for other production companies that lack the necessary infrastructure. Said production complex was rehabilitated to be used with all biosecurity measures in the face of the COVID-19 pandemic in Mexico. On December 1, 2021, the departure of Patricia Jasin would be announced to focus on future projects outside of TV Azteca, on December 17 the incorporation of Guillermo Wilkins González as the new general director of Azteca Estudios was announced.

See also 
TV Azteca Telenovelas and Series
Estudios América

References

External links 
 

TV Azteca
Mexican film studios
Television production companies of Mexico
Television studios
Mass media in Mexico City
1996 establishments in Mexico
Coyoacán